Orcas, Washington may refer to:
 Orcas Island, San Juan Islands, Washington, U.S.
 Orcas Village, Washington, a community on Orcas island, Washington, U.S.

See also
 Orca (disambiguation)